The Dongzhi Festival or Winter Solstice Festival is one of the most important Asian festivals celebrated by the Chinese, Hong Kongers, Taiwanese, Japanese, Vietnamese, Koreans, Filipinos and other East Asian-related people during the Dongzhi solar term (winter solstice), some day between December 21 to December 23.

The origins of this festival can be traced back to the yin and yang philosophy of balance and harmony in the cosmos. After this celebration, it is believed that days will have longer daylight hours and therefore create an increase in positive energy flowing in. The philosophical significance of this is symbolized by the I Ching hexagram fu ("Returning").

Traditional activities
Traditionally, the Dongzhi Festival is a time for families to get together. One activity that occurs during these get-togethers (especially in the Asia and in Overseas Asian communities) is the making and eating of tangyuan (汤圆) or balls of glutinous rice, which symbolize reunion. Tangyuan are made of glutinous rice flour and are sometimes coloured pink or green. Each family member receives at least one large tangyuan in addition to several small ones. The flour balls are cooked in a sweet soup or savory broth with both the ball and the soup/broth served in one bowl. It is also often served with jiuniang, a mildly alcoholic, unfiltered rice wine containing whole grains of glutinous rice (and often also sweet osmanthus flowers).

In northern China, people typically eat dumplings on Dongzhi. This custom is said to have been started by Zhang Zhongjing in the Han Dynasty. One cold winter day, he saw the poor suffering from chilblains on their ears. Feeling sympathetic, he ordered his apprentices to make dumplings with lamb and other ingredients, and distribute them among the poor to keep them warm and prevent their ears from getting chilblains. Since the dumplings were shaped like ears, Zhang named the dish "qùhán jiāoěr tāng" (祛寒娇耳汤) or dumpling soup that expels the cold. From that time on, it has been a tradition to eat dumplings on the day of Dongzhi.

In southern China, people eat rice cake, which means reunion. It is not only eaten by the family, but also shared with friends and relatives as a blessing. Mutton soup, rice cake and red bean sticky rice are also popular in southern China.

Old traditions also require people with the same surname or from the same clan to gather at their ancestral temples to worship on this day. There is always a grand reunion dinner following the sacrificial ceremony.

Another tradition is eating hot pot.

The festive food is also a reminder that celebrators are now a year older and should behave better in the coming year. Even today, many Chinese around the world, especially the elderly, still insist that one is "a year older" right after the Dongzhi celebration instead of waiting for the lunar new year.

In Taiwan

The Dongzhi Festival is also very important to Taiwanese people. It is also a tradition for Taiwanese to eat tangyuan on this day. They also use the festive food as an offering dish to worship the ancestors.

In accordance with Taiwanese history, many people take some of the tangyuan that have been used as offerings and stick them on the back of the door or on windows and tables and chairs. These "empowered" tangyuan supposedly serve as protective talismans to keep evil spirits away from children.

As well as following some of the customs practiced on mainland China, the people of Taiwan have a unique custom of offering nine-layer cakes as a ceremonial sacrifice to worship their ancestors. These cakes are made using glutinous rice flour in the shape of a chicken, duck, tortoise, pig, cow, or sheep, and then steamed in different layers of a pot. These animals all signify auspiciousness in Chinese tradition.

Many people take invigorating tonic foods during this particular winter festival. To the Taiwanese, winter is a time when most physical activities should be limited and you should eat well to nourish your body. This practice follows the habits shown by many animals which follow the law of nature and hibernate throughout winter months to rejuvenate and to preserve life. In order to fight cold temperatures, it is necessary to eat more fatty and meaty foods during winter when your body can better absorb the rich and nutritional foods at this time due to a slower metabolic rate.

Since Dongzhi is the "extreme of winter", Taiwanese regard it as the best time of the year to take tonic foods. Some of the most widely popular winter tonic foods enjoyed by Taiwanese to fight cold and strengthen the body's resistance are mutton hot pot and ginger duck hot pot. Other foods like chicken, pork, and abalone are also common ingredients used in making tonic foods with nurturing herbs such as ginseng, deer horn, and the fungus cordyceps.

In China 
In Chinese, the word "Dong" means "winter" while "Zhi" means "arrival" giving the literal meaning of the festival "the coming of winter". Dongzhi celebrates the winter solstice, usually around December 21st to 23rd, and is observed on the longest night of the year. Symbolizing the victory of light over darkness, Dongzhi, represents that the days will start to grow longer and bring a sense of balance and harmony to people's lives. Based on Chinese beliefs of yin yang, "Yang" represents positive energy, warmth, and light. Following the Dongzhi Festival, daytime will gradually lengthen, as "Yang" will also increase. It was also believed by some that that it was the day the Kitchen God went to heaven to report to the Jade Emperor the conduct of a family.

The festival was first celebrated by the Chinese people during the Zhou Dynasty (1045 BC–256 BC) and declared an official celebration during the Han Dynasty (206 BC–220 BC). The Han people would take a break from work to celebrate with their families. They would hold heaven worshipping as well as honoring their ancestors by burning joss paper at their ancestral shrines to show gratitude.

The Chinese people still celebrate certain practices during the Dongzhi festival, such as the union of family. Unlike the pearly white tangyuan that is usually eaten during the Lantern Festival, people dye these glutinous balls pink or red to represent fortuitous colors in Chinese society.  Many Chinese elders still insist that people get a year older after Dongzhi, and "if you do not partake of a red tangyuan and a white tangyuan, you will not grow a year older." Common superstitions include that tangyuan should be swallowed in pairs for good luck, a married person should leave two uneaten to have their wishes come true, and a single person should leave one for an auspicious year.The Dongzhi Festival has historically been associated with various agricultural activities in China, particularly in rural areas. As the festival represents the  winter solstice, it is a crucial time to harvest winter crops, such as wheat, barley, and radishes. It is also an important time to pay respect to certain livestock and feed these animals special meals to celebrate the occasion.

See also
 
List of Buddhist festivals
List of festivals in China
List of festivals in Japan
List of Korean traditional festivals
List of traditional festivals in Vietnam
Solstice
Dongzhi (solar term)
Winter Solstice
Yaldā Night (similar festival in Persian culture)

References

External links
 Taiwan Culture Portal Taiwan Culture Portal: The Winter Solstice in Taiwan

Annual events in South Korea
Buddhist festivals in Korea
Buddhist festivals in Taiwan
Folk festivals in China
Folk festivals in Japan
Folk festivals in South Korea
Festivals in Vietnam
December observances
Observances set by the Chinese calendar
Public holidays in China
Public holidays in Hong Kong
Public holidays in Japan
Public holidays in South Korea
Public holidays in Taiwan
Religious festivals in China
Winter events in China
Winter events in Japan
Winter events in South Korea
Winter events in Taiwan
Winter festivals
Buddhist festivals in Japan